The Rue Victor Hugo or Victor Hugostraat (Dutch) is a street in the Schaerbeek municipality of Brussels, Belgium. It is named after the French writer Victor Hugo, who spent his exile of 1851 to 1870 in Brussels. It runs from the / to the /.

Notable addresses
 No. 53–59: building of the Foyer Schaerbeekois, by the architect Henri Jacobs
 No. 100: Collège Roi Baudouin
 No. 147: Church of St. Albert

External links

 
 Satellite view of the street on WikiMapia

Victor Hugo
Schaerbeek